Big Branch is an unincorporated community in St. Tammany Parish, Louisiana, United States.

The Big Branch Marsh National Wildlife Refuge lies along the coast of Lake Pontchartrain south of the community between Mandeville and Slidell.

References

Unincorporated communities in St. Tammany Parish, Louisiana
Unincorporated communities in Louisiana
Unincorporated communities in New Orleans metropolitan area